You and Me may refer to:

Books
 You & Me, a 2012 novel by Padgett Powell
 Yuu & Mii, a 1984 manga by Hiroshi Aro

Film and television
 You and Me (1938 film), by Fritz Lang
 You and Me (Neowa Na), a 1967 South Korean film starring Choi Moo-ryong
 You and Me (1975 film), a 1975 film by David Carradine
 You and Me (2005 film) (Wo men lia), a Chinese film directed by Ma Liwen
 You and Me (British TV series), a British children's television programme
 You and Me (American TV series), a 1993 telethon series on Christian Television Network
 You and Me (New Zealand TV series), a family show hosted by Suzy Cato
 You & Me (TV series), British romantic-comedy drama television series
 You and Me (anime) (Kimi to Boku), a 2011 anime series based on the manga Kimi to Boku

Music

Artists
 You+Me, duo with Alecia Moore and Dallas Green, and the title song, "You and Me" (see below)

Albums
 You 'n' Me (Al Cohn-Zoot Sims Quintet album), 1960
 You & Me (Joe Bonamassa album), 2006
 You & Me (EP), by KARD, 2017
 You and Me (Open Hand album), and the title song, 2005
 You and Me (Shane Filan album), 2013
 You and Me (Tammy Wynette album), and the title song (see below), 1976
  You & Me (The Walkmen album), 2008
 You and Me, by Declan Galbraith, and the title song, 2007
 You and Me, by Little Brazil, and the title song, 2005

Songs
 "You and Me" (Alice Cooper song)
 "You & Me" (Ayumi Hamasaki song)
 "U & Me", by Cappella
 "U & Mi", by Dr. Alban
 "You and Me" (Damon Albarn song)
 "You and Me" (Dave Matthews Band song)
 "You & Me" (Disclosure song)
 "You & Me" (The Flirts song)
 "You and Me" (Joan Franka song)
 "You and Me" (La Toya Jackson song)
 "You and Me" (Lifehouse song)
 "You and Me" (LL Cool J song)
 "You & Me" (Marc E. Bassy song)
 "U + Me (Love Lesson)", by Mary J. Blige
 "You and Me" (The Moody Blues song)
 "You and Me" (Olympic theme song), the theme song of the 2008 Summer Olympics
 "You & Me" (Superfly song)
 "You and Me" (Takasa song)
 "You and Me" (Tammy Wynette song)
 "You and Me" (Uniting Nations song)
 "You and Me (Babe)", by Ringo Starr
 "You and Me (Tonight)", by Alistair Griffin
 "You and Me Song", by The Wannadies
 "Now and Forever (You and Me)", by Anne Murray
 "Promise (You and Me)", by Reamonn
 "Tú y Yo" (Thalía song) ("You and Me"), by Thalía
 "You and Me", by Aaron Pritchett from In the Driver's Seat
 "You and Me", by Archers of Loaf from Icky Mettle
 "You and Me", by Aretha Franklin from Spirit in the Dark
 "You and Me", by Ben Rector from Something Like This
 "You and Me", by Bowling for Soup from Tell Me When to Whoa
 "You and Me", by the Byrds, from the reissue of Mr. Tambourine Man
 "You + Me", by Carola Häggkvist from My Show
 "You and Me", by The Cockroaches
 "You and Me", by Connie Smith from Long Line of Heartaches
 "You and Me", by The Cranberries from Bury the Hatchet
 "You and Me", by Crash Vegas
 "You & Me", by Easyworld from This Is Where I Stand
 "You and Me", by Ed Roland from Anniversary
 "You and Me", by Enchantment from Soft Lights, Sweet Music
 "You and Me", by Frost
 "You and Me", by Go from Go Too
 "You and Me", by Gustaf Spetz
 "You and Me", by J-Kwon from Hood Hop
 "You and Me", by James Brown from I'm Real
 "You and Me", by Jeanie Tracy from Me and You
 "You and Me", by Jimmy Rankin from Song Dog
 "You and Me", by Joe Pass from Simplicity
 "You and Me", by John Cale from Helen of Troy
 "You and Me", by Johnny Cash from Gone Girl
 "You and Me", by June
 "U and Me", by Junior Senior from Say Hello, Wave Goodbye
 "You and Me", by Keef Hartley from Lancashire Hustler
 "You and Me", by Ken Block from Drift
 "You and Me", by Kenny Rogers with Dottie West, from Every Time Two Fools Collide
 "You & Me", by Laze & Royal featuring Myah Marie!
 "You and Me", by Leslie Cheung from Red
 "You and Me", by Lil Suzy from Back to Dance
 "You and Me", by Marlena Shaw from Just a Matter of Time
 "You & Me", by Marshmello
 "You and Me", by Mick Ronson from Heaven and Hull
 "You and Me", by Mike Harrison from Rainbow Rider
 "You and Me", by Modern Talking from Romantic Warriors
 "You And Me", by Mumzy Stranger from Mumzy MixTape
 "You and Me", by Musiq from Aijuswanaseing
 "You and Me", by Neil Young from Harvest Moon
 "You and Me", by Niall Horan from Flicker
 "You and Me", by the O'Jays from Family Reunion
 "You and Me", by Ohio Players from Ecstasy
 "You and Me", by One Night Only from Started a Fire
 "You and Me", by Parachute from The Way It Was
 "You and Me", by Patti LaBelle from It's Alright with Me
 "You and Me", by Patty Larkin from Perishable Fruit
 "You & Me", by Penny and the Quarters
 "You and Me", by Peter Allen from Not the Boy Next Door
 "You and Me", by Plain White T's from Every Second Counts
 "You and Me", by Roger Daltrey from Daltrey
 "You and Me", by Ronnie Dyson from The More You Do It
 "You and Me", by Robyne Dunn, Geoff Robertson & Kevin Bennett from the film Blinky Bill: The Mischievous Koala
 "You and Me", by Sandy Green
 "You and Me", by Sonny & Cher
 "You and Me", by Stevie Wonder from My Cherie Amour
 "You and Me", by the Stylistics from Round 2
 "You and Me", by T-Pain, an unreleased song from Rappa Ternt Sanga
"You & Me",  by Tally Hall from Good & Evil
 "You and Me", by Tessanne Chin from In Between Words
 "You and Me", by Tiffany from the film Jetsons: The Movie
 "You and Me", by Tom Petty from The Last DJ
 "U & Me", by Trina from Diamond Princess
 "You and Me", by Trio Töykeät from Wake
 "You and Me", by UFO from Making Contact
 "You and Me", by Vega 4 from You and Others
 "You and Me", by Vengaboys from The Party Album
 "You and Me", by the Veronicas from their eponymous album
 "You and Me", by the Verve from the single "This Is Music"
 "You and Me", by Wayne Brady from A Long Time Coming
 "You 'N' Me", by Whitesnake from Lovehunter
 "You and Me", by You+Me from Rose ave.
 "You and Me", by Zakir Hussain from Making Music
 "You and Me", from the film Victor Victoria
 "You and Me (But Mostly Me)", from the musical The Book of Mormon
 "You and Me (In My Pocket)", by Milow
 "You and Me (Less than Zero)", by Danzig from Less than Zero soundtrack
 "You and Me (Voce e Eu)", by Lalo Schifrin from Piano, Strings and Bossa Nova
 "You and Me (We Wanted It All)", by Christian Bautista and Rachelle Ann Go
 "You and Me (We Wanted It All)", by Frank Sinatra from Trilogy
 "You and Me", from the film Descendants 2
 "You and Me, Me and You", by Nella and Trinket from Nella the Princess Knight

Theatre
 You and Me (Peking opera), a 2013 Peking opera production directed by Zhang Yimou

See also
 Between You and Me (disambiguation)
 Just Between You and Me (disambiguation)
 Me and You (disambiguation)
 You and I (disambiguation)
You, Me and Him, 2007 film
You, Me and Him (2017 film)